Waverly Beach is an unincorporated community in the Town of Harrison, Calumet County, Wisconsin and Fox Crossing, Winnebago County, Wisconsin, United States.

References

Unincorporated communities in Calumet County, Wisconsin
Unincorporated communities in Winnebago County, Wisconsin
Unincorporated communities in Wisconsin